Lobito is a municipality in Angola. It is located in Benguela Province, on the Atlantic Coast north of the Catumbela Estuary. The Lobito municipality had a population of 393,079 in 2014.

History

The city was founded in 1843 and owes its existence to the bay of the same name having been chosen as the sea terminus of the Benguela railway to the far interior, passing through Luau to Katanga in  the Democratic Republic of the Congo. The city is located on the coast of the Atlantic Ocean.  The population of the municipality is 393,079 (2014) in an area of 3,648 km². The municipality consists of the communes Canjala, Egipto Praia and Lobito.

Portuguese rule
Lobito, was built on a sandspit and reclaimed land, with one of Africa's finest natural harbours, protected by a 5 km long sandspit. The old municipality (concelho) was created in 1843 by the Portuguese administration. The town was also founded in 1843 by order of Maria II of Portugal, and its harbour works were begun in 1903.

It wasn't until 1843 that Maria II of Portugal approved the foundation of the town, which had by then been known as Catumbela das Ostras (Catumbela of Oysters)

Large developments, however, were not stimulated until the completion in 1928 of the important Benguela Railway, which connected Portuguese Angola with the Belgian Congo.

Under Portuguese rule, the port was one of Angola's busiest, exporting agricultural produce from the interior and handling transit trade from the mines of southeastern Belgian Congo and of Northern Rhodesia. Fishing, tourism and services were also important. The carnival in Lobito was also one of the most renowned and popular in Portuguese Angola.

Post-independence

After the April 25, 1974 Carnation Revolution in Lisbon, Angola was offered independence. Lobito's port activities were highly limited by disruptions to railway transit and high insecurity during the Angolan Civil War (1975–2002). With peace and stability, in the 2000s, Lobito started the process of reconstruction and resumed its path to development.

Climate 
Lobito experiences a mild tropical arid climate with few temperature extremes. The winters are extremely dry and warm, while summers are relatively wet and hotter.

Transportation

Lobito is the terminus of the Benguela Railway

Port

The Port of Lobito is located in Lobito Bay on a sandspit approximately 4.8 km long. The port is administered by the Empresa Portuaria do Lobito. The Port of Lobito handles 2,000,000 tonnes of cargo and 370 ships annually, and along with economic development in the Benguala region, port facilities are under expansion.

Airports

Lobito does not have its own airport.

International Relations

Lobito is twinned with:

 Sintra, Portugal
 Lowell, Massachusetts, United States

References

Populated places in Benguela Province
Port cities and towns in Angola
Municipalities of Angola
1843 establishments in the Portuguese Empire